At least three ships of the Royal Navy have borne the name HMS Wellington:

 The French brig  was renamed HMS Wellington after her capture in 1810 but never commissioned and was broken up in 1812.
  was a 74-gun ship launched in 1816 and renamed HMS Akbar in 1862.
  was a  sloop launched in 1934. After World War II she was converted to "Head Quarters Ship" HQS Wellington at Chatham Dockyard. Since December 1946 she has been moored at Victoria Embankment, where she serves as the floating livery hall of the Honourable Company of Master Mariners.

See also
 
 , at least two ships
 

Royal Navy ship names